Lahore is the capital of Punjab, the most populous  province of Pakistan. It has a rich cosmopolitan history and was the principal city of the vast plain of the entire Punjab region for many centuries, and was the capital of the Sikh empire of Maharaja Ranjit Singh until the mid-1850s when it was conquered by the British.  Before the partition of British India in 1947, Lahore had a large Hindu, Sikh and Jain population. In 1941, 64.5% of the population of Lahore was Muslim, while about 36% was Hindu or Sikh. At that time, the city contained numerous Hindu temples, Jain temples, and Sikh gurdwaras. The overwhelming majority of Lahore and West Punjab's non-Christian minority population fled to India at Partition, while East Punjab was similarly depopulated of almost its entire Muslim population. For example, on the eve of Partition, Amritsar was about 49% Muslim, whereas in the 1951 census, the figure had dropped to only 0.52%, while Ludhiana was 63% Muslim prior to Partition, but 97% Hindu and Sikh in the 1961 census. As a result of religious demographic changes and political tensions, almost all Hindu and Jain temples have been abandoned in Lahore, although several important Sikh shrines continue to operate.

The condition of temples in Lahore is not good, it is not like that the city lack temples but they are not maintained so much as Hindus migrated from Lahore in 1947 en masse. In 1992 after demolition of Babri Masjid, in Pakistan especially in Lahore, temples were attacked and destroyed, many temples were completely destructed.

Hindu temples

Only two Hindu temples are currently functional in Lahore.

 Krishna Mandir, Lahore at Ravi Road,
 Valmiki Mandir, Lahore or Neela Gumbad Mandir, only functional temple in lahore besides Krishna temple
The following Hindu temples lay abandoned or were destroyed: 
 Akbari Mandi Temple
 Arya Samaj Temple
 Bhairav ka Asthan, Ichhra
 Bal Mata Temple at Shah Almi
Chand Raat Temple, Ichhra
 Doodhwali Mata Tample (between Shah Almi and Lohari gate)
 Lava Temple (son of Ram– According to Hindu legend, Lahore is named after him)
 Mahadev, there is a Bhairav temple also
 Mandir Wachhowali
 Mela Ram Talao Temple
 Model Town B Block Temple
 Model Town D Block Temple 
 Ramgali Temple
 Rattan Chand Temple, Old Anarkali and its former temple tank currently a grassy field known as Azad Park.
 Sheetla Temple, Mohalla Chiri Marian, Shah Almi
Tulsi Mandir, Mohalla Chiri Marian, Shah Almi
Aitchison College Temple
Bhadrakali Temple, Gulzar Colony (Now a School)
Old Basuli Hanuman Temple, Old Anarkali
Devi ka Asthan, Lohari Gate
Lala Nihal Chand Temple (Abandoned)

Jain temples
All of Jain temples in Lahore are either abandoned or destroyed.

 Jain Shwetambar Temple with Shikhar, Thari Bhabrian
 Jain Digambar Temple with Shikhar, Thari Bhabrian
 Jain Shwetambar Dada Wadi (Mini Temple), Guru Mangat in Lahore Cantt
 Jain Digambar Temple with Shikhar, Old Anarkali (Jain Mandir Chawk)
Aitchison College Jain Mandir

Sikh gurdwaras

Several of Lahore's gurdwaras remain functional, including:

 Samadhi of Ranjit Singh
 Gurdwara Dera Sahib
 Gurdwara Janam Asthan Guru Ram Das
 Shaheed Ganj Bhai Taru Singh (on the site of the former Shaheed Ganj Mosque)
 Gurdwara Shahid Ganj Singh Singhania

The following gurdwaras are abandoned:
 Gurudwara Guru Nanak Garh Sahib 
 Gurudwara Baoli Sahib
 Gurudwara Chaumala
 Gurudwara Chhevin Patshahi, Mozang
 Gurdwara Lal Khoohi
 Gurudwara Janamsathan Bebe Nanki

See also

 Katasraj Temple
 Lava temple, Lahore fort
 Evacuee Trust Property Board
 Pakistan Hindu Council
 Shri Krishna Mandir, Rawalpindi
 List of Hindu temples in Pakistan

References

 01
.T
.Lahore
Lahore-related lists
Lahore
20th-century Hinduism
Pakistan religion-related lists